Jozo Šimunović (born 4 August 1994) is a Croatian professional footballer who most recently played as a centre back for Prva HNL club Gorica.

Club career

Early career
Šimunović started playing football at age of 7 in his village, Gornja Lomnica. At the age of 12 he joined Dinamo Zagreb from Hrvatski Dragovoljac.

Dinamo Zagreb
Šimunović made his debut for Dinamo Zagreb on 16 March 2013 against Istra 1961, coming as a 90th-minute substitute. On 30 March 2013, he scored his first goal for Dinamo against Zadar. He played the whole game in Dinamo's 4–2 win on penalty kicks over RNK Split in the 2015 Croatian Cup Final on 20 May 2015.

Celtic

On 1 September 2015, Šimunović joined Scottish Premiership side Celtic for an undisclosed fee. He made his debut on 17 September, playing in Celtic's 2–2 draw away against Ajax in the Europa League, and had a good game. An ankle injury shortly afterwards and the team's erratic form, however, hindered Šimunović's attempts to make much impact at his new club. On 15 January 2016, Šimunović scored his first goal for Celtic in a 4–1 victory over Dundee United, but suffered knee ligament damage a week later and was ruled out for six weeks; however, he was kept off for the rest of the season, to recover properly.

On 13 and 14 July, Šimunović stated on his Twitter account that he had spent the last nine weeks in Belgrade recovering from his injury, and would be returning to Glasgow later that week, and denied media speculation that he would be leaving Celtic to join Torino. On 30 August 2016, contrary to his prior announcement, Šimunović travelled to Turin to have a medical with Torino. Despite passing his medical, it was announced the following day that the move was off as the two clubs could not agree a fee. Šimunović stated afterwards on Twitter that he was "completely healthy and fit" and was entirely focused on the challenge ahead with Celtic. On 18 September 2016, he made his long-awaited return to action as a substitute in Celtic's 2–2 draw with Inverness.

Šimunović re-established himself in the team, and formed a solid partnership in central defence alongside Erik Sviatchenko which saw Celtic go on a run of nine clean sheets. During this time he also played in Celtic's 3–0 win over Aberdeen in the 2016 Scottish League Cup Final in November, and played the pass in to Tom Rogic for Celtic's opening goal. After the cup final win, he told Croatian newspaper Sportske novosti that, "It was really phenomenal. The atmosphere is normally great in our games, but this time it was extra special, because it was the 100th trophy of the club." In March 2017, Šimunović scored Celtic's first goal in a 2–1 win away at Dundee, extending the club's lead in the league to 25 points ahead of second-placed Aberdeen as they closed in on their 48th league championship. 

On 11 September 2017, he signed a new contract with Celtic, expiring in summer 2020, with a possible one year extension.

During the first match following the passing of Celtic club legend Billy McNeill, Šimunović scored the winner to earn all three points against Kilmarnock, taking the Celts within one point of securing eight league titles in a row. The goal went down in the history of Celtic as a special one, having been scored in the 67th minute by Celtic's centre back and number 5, a tribute to the late McNeill. Following the game, Šimunović donated his number 5 shirt to the McNeill family.

In September 2019, Šimunović suffered a knee injury. On 30 May 2020, Celtic announced Šimunović would leave the club after his contract expires in summer 2020.

HNK Gorica

On 20 October 2021, HNK Gorica announced the signing of Šimunović as a free transfer.

International career
Šimunović has represented Croatia on all youth levels. He was captain of the Croatian under-17, under-19 and the under-21 teams.

In September 2015, he received a first call-up for the senior national team, for the last UEFA Euro 2016 qualifying matches, against Bulgaria and Malta, as a substitute for injured Dejan Lovren, but suffered an injury days later, which prevented him from playing.

In July 2017, Šimunović chose to represent Bosnia and Herzegovina, whom he qualifies for as his entire family hails from Jajce. He had reportedly become frustrated by the lack of opportunities to play for Croatia. He was called up a month later by Bosnia and Herzegovina coach Mehmed Baždarević for the 2018 World Cup qualifiers against Cyprus and Gibraltar; however, he did not debut for the national team despite being expected to do so against the latter opponent. In March 2018, he rejected the call-up from new Bosnia and Herzegovina coach Robert Prosinečki for friendly games against Bulgaria and Senegal. Days later, he revealed that he does not want to represent Bosnia and Herzegovina internationally because he "loves Croatia too much".

Career statistics

Club

Honours

Club
Dinamo Zagreb
Prva HNL: 2012–13, 2013–14, 2014–15
Croatian Cup: 2014–15
Croatian Super Cup: 2013

Celtic
Scottish Premiership: 2015–16, 2016–17, 2017–18, 2018–19, 2019–20
Scottish Cup: 2016–17, 2017–18, 2018–19
Scottish League Cup: 2016–17, 2017–18, 2018–19

References

External links
 

1994 births
Living people
Footballers from Zagreb
Association football central defenders
Bosnia and Herzegovina footballers
Croatian footballers
Croatia youth international footballers
Croatia under-21 international footballers
GNK Dinamo Zagreb players
Celtic F.C. players
HNK Gorica players
Croatian Football League players
Scottish Professional Football League players
Croatian expatriate footballers
Expatriate footballers in Scotland
Croatian expatriate sportspeople in Scotland